Preeja Sreedharan (born 13 March 1982 at Mullakkanam, Idukki, Kerala) is an Indian long-distance runner. She holds the national records in both the 10,000 metres and 5000 metres disciplines, which she set en route to the gold and silver medals at 2010 Guangzhou Asian Games. Sreedharan was conferred with the Arjuna Award, India's second highest sporting honour by the central government in 2011.

Sreedharan's breakthrough came in 2007, when she won the silver medal in both the disciplines at the Asian Athletics Championships. She bettered her personal bests and the Indian national records in both the 10000 and 5000 meters at 2010 Asian Games; she won the gold in the 10000 meters and the silver in 5000 meters. She announced her retirement from international circuit in February 2015.

Personal life

Preeja was born to Sreedharan and Remani in Idukki, Kerala.She belonged to a middle class family. Her father was a manual labourer and passed away when she was 8 years old. She has an elder brother Pradeep and an elder sister Preethy. After her father's demise her brother had to leave school at 6th standard and take up job in order to meet household expenses.  She graduated from Alphonsa College, Pala. She married Dr.Deepak Gopinath on 11 November 2012 at Palakkad, Kerala. Preeja Sreedharan has been employed as a Superintendent by the Southern Railway. The couple have two children, Darshan (born on 2016) and Dhyan (born on 2018).

Career
At the 2006 Asian Games, Sreedharan finished fifth in both the 5000 and the 10,000 metres. At the 2007 Asian Championships at Amman she won the silver medals in the two events. She qualified for the Beijing Olympics in June 2008 after achieving a B qualifying mark for the Games and then finished twenty-fifth in the Olympic 10,000 metres.

Sreedharan achieved her personal best of 31:50:28 minutes in the 10,000 metres en route to the gold medal at the 2010 Guangzhou Asian Games; she also broke the Indian national record with the performance. Sreedharan also won the silver medal in 5000 metres at the event. With the time of 	15:15.89 minutes, she also bettered the national record in 5000 meters.

Sreedharan was selected as Manorama Newsmaker of the year 2010. The selection was done through an online SMS voting from public. The finalists with Preeja were, Booker Prize winner Arundhati Roy, Njhanpeedam winner and famous Malayalam poet ONV Kurup and famous politician, and financial minister K. M. Mani.

Sreedharan was the fastest Indian woman at the 2014 Delhi Half Marathon. She also participated at the 2014 Asian Games, but was unable to win any medal. Sreedharan announced her retirement from international competitions in February 2015. She said that she would participate in her last competition at the 2015 National Athletics Championships: "With the next national games, I would leave the track for ever. The decision was taken to focus on family life, I would continue to strive for promoting athletics."

Most Important landmarks in career

•	She is the Indian athlete to represent India in 10000m in Olympics. She qualified for the Beijing Olympics in June 2008 after achieving a B qualifying mark for the Games and then finished twenty-fifth in the Olympic 10,000 metres.

•	She won Gold medal in the 10,000 metres event and Silver medal in 5000 metres at the Guangzhou Asian Games 2010.

•	She holds Indian national record for both 5000 and 10,000 metres as on 18.10.2020.

•	At the 2007 Asian Championships at Amman, she won the silver medal in the 10,000 metres and 5000 Meters.

•	Her personal best for the 10,000 metres is 31:50:28 minutes  in Guangzhou Asian Games. This is the current Indian national record .

•	Her personal best for the 5000 metres is 15:15 minutes  in Guangzhou Asian Games. This is the current Indian national record.

•	She was selected as Manorama Newsmaker of the year 2010( Kerala State ).

International Acievements

Beijing Olympics 2008	10000m	Participation

Asian Games – Guangzhau 2010	10000m	Gold Medal  (Current National Record )

Asian Games – Guangzhau 2010	5000m	Silver Medal  (current National record )

Asian Athletics Championship 2007	10000m	Silver Medal

Asian Aathletic Championship 2007	5000m	Silver Medal

2nd Asian Indoor Games Macao – 2007	3000m	Silver Medal

3rd  Asian Indoor Championship – Doha 2008	3000m	Gold Medal

10th South Asian Games Columbo 2006	10000m	Gold medal

19th Asian Athletic Championship Kobai 2011	10000m	Bronze Medal

6th Asian Cross Country Kadmandu  2001	4KM	Silver Medal

NATIONAL LEVEL

9th National Athletic Championship Thrissur-2001	10000m	Gold Medal

9th National Athletic Championship Thrissur 2001	5000m	Gold Medal

10th National athletic championship – Chandigarh 2002	1500m	Gold Medal

10th National athletic championship – Chandigarh 2002	5000m	Silver Medal

37th National Cross Country Championship Goa	4 km	Gold Medal

7th  Federation Cup Cross country 2002	8 km	Bronze  Medal

44th  National Open Athletics Championship – Mumbai 2004	5000m	Gold Medal

44th National Interstate Senior Athletic Championship 2004	5000m	Silver Medal

44th National Interstate Senior Athletic Championship 2004	1500m	Bronze Medal

38th National Cross country Championship Shimla 2004	4 km race	Gold Medal

45th National Interstate Senior athletics championship – Bangalore 2005	5000m	Bronze Medal

11th Federation cup National Senior Athletics championship Delhi	5000m	Silver Medal

45th National Open Athletic Championship Hyderabad 2005	5000m	Silver Medal

45th National Open Athletic Championship Hyderabad 2005 	1500m	Bronze Medal

46th National Open Athletic Championship Delhi 2006	10000m	Gold Medal

46th National Interstate Senior Athletic Championship Chennai 2006	10000m	Gold Medal

46th National Interstate Senior Athletic Championship Chennai 2006	5000m	Gold Medal

1st National Endurance Athletic Competition Delhi 2006	1500m	Silver Medal

33rd  National Games Guwahati 2007	10000	Gold Medal

33rd National Games Guwahati 2007	5000m	Gold Medal

33rd  National Games Guwahati 2007	1500 m	Gold Medal

47th National  Open Athletic Championship Jamshedpur 2007	10000m	Gold Medal

47th National  Open Athletic Championship Jamshedpur 2007	5000m	Gold Medal

47th National Interstate Senior Athletic Championship Bhopal 2007	10000m	Silver Medal

47th National Interstate Senior Athletic Championship Bhopal 	5000m	Silver Medal

48th National Open Athletic Championship Kochi 2008	10000m	Gold Medal

48th National Open Athletic Championship Kochi 2008	5000m	Gold Medal

14th Federation Cup National Senior Athletic Championship 2008 Bhopal	5000m	Silver Medal

50th National Interstate Senior Athletic Championship Patiala  2010	10000m	Gold Medal

15th  Federation Cup National Senior Athletic Championship  Ranchi 2010	10000m	Gold Medal

50th  National Open Athletic Championship – Kochi 2010	10000m	Silver Medal

15th Federation Cup National Senior Athletic Championship  Ranchi 2010	5000m	Silver Medal

51st  National Open Athletic Championship – Kolkata 2011	10000m	Gold Medal

34th National Games, Jharkhand 2011	10000m	Silver Medal

34th National Games, Jharkhand 2011	5000m	Silver Medal

53rd  National Open Athletic Championship – Ranchi 2013	10000m	Bronze medal

53rd  National Open Athletic Championship – Ranchi 2013 	5000m	Silver Medal

53rd National Interstate Senior Athletic Championship Chennai 2013	10000m	Gold Medal

53rd National Interstate Senior Athletic Championship Chennai 2013	5000m	Silver Medal

48th National Cross country championships Jalpaiguri 2013	8 KM	Gold Medal

54th  National Open Athletic Championship – Delhi 2014 	10000m	Silver Medal

35th National games Kerala 2015	10000m	Silver Medal

Awards
Following her performance at the 2010 Asian Games, Sreedharan was conferred with the Arjuna Award in 2011 by the Government of India.

G V Raja Award  ( Kerala State ) – 2001

Manorama Newsmaker of the Year ( Kerala State ) – 2011

Jimmy Gorge Award- 2012

References

External links
 

1982 births
Living people
Sportswomen from Kerala
Indian female long-distance runners
21st-century Indian women
21st-century Indian people
Athletes (track and field) at the 2006 Asian Games
Athletes (track and field) at the 2010 Asian Games
Athletes (track and field) at the 2014 Asian Games
Athletes (track and field) at the 2010 Commonwealth Games
Asian Games medalists in athletics (track and field)
Athletes (track and field) at the 2008 Summer Olympics
Commonwealth Games competitors for India
People from Idukki district
Asian Games gold medalists for India
Asian Games silver medalists for India
Medalists at the 2010 Asian Games
Athletes from Kerala
Olympic athletes of India
Recipients of the Arjuna Award